The Singapore women's national water polo team represents Singapore in international women's water polo. The team won the gold medal at the 2011 Southeast Asian Games in Indonesia and the silver medal in 2015, 2017 and 2019.

Results

Asian Games

Southeast Asian Games

Asian Water Polo Championship

References

Water polo
Singapore
Singapore
Singapore